Airpark East Airport  is a privately owned public-use airport located  northwest of the central business district of Terrell, Texas, United States. The airport is used solely for general aviation purposes. The airport is in both Rockwall and Kaufman counties.

Facilities 
Airpark East Airport has one runway:
 Runway 13/31: 2,630 x 30 ft. (802 x 9 m), Surface: Asphalt

References

External links 
 

Airports in Texas
Airports in the Dallas–Fort Worth metroplex
Transportation in Kaufman County, Texas
Transportation in Rockwall County, Texas